The year 2016 was the 24th year in the history of the Ultimate Fighting Championship, a mixed martial arts promotion based in the United States.

Title fights

The Ultimate Fighter

Debut UFC fighters
The following fighters fought their first UFC fight in 2016:

Abdul Razak Alhassan
Adam Milstead
Albert Morales
Alberto Uda
Alessandro Ricci
Alessio Di Chirico
Alex Morono
Alex Nicholson
Alexander Volkanovski
Alexa Grasso
Amanda Cooper
Andrew Sanchez
Anna Elmose
Ashley Yoder
Augusto Mendes
Belal Muhammad
Bojan Veličković
Brandon Moreno
Brett Johns
Brian Camozzi
Cristiane Justino
CM Punk
Charlie Ward
Chase Sherman
Chris Avila
Christian Colombo
Claudio Puelles
Cody East
Cory Hendricks
Cristina Stanciu
Curtis Blaydes
Cyril Asker
Damian Grabowski
Damir Hadzovic
Danielle Taylor
Darrell Horcher
Darren Stewart
David Teymur
Damien Brown
Devin Clark
Dmitry Smolyakov
Elvis Mutapčić
Emil Weber Meek
Eric Spicely
Filip Pejić
Felipe Olivieri
Felipe Silva
Gadzhimurad Antigulov
Gerald Meerschaert
Gregor Gillespie
Hector Sandoval
Henrique da Silva
Ion Cutelaba
Irene Aldana
J.C. Cottrell
Jack Hermansson
Jarjis Danho
Jason Gonzalez
Jason Novelli
Jenel Lausa
Jeremy Kennedy
Jessin Ayari
Jim Wallhead
Joe Gigliotti
Joey Gomez
Joachim Christensen
Jonathan Meunier
Jordan Rinaldi
Josh Emmett
Josh Stansbury
Justin Ledet
Katlyn Chookagian
Kelly Faszholz
Ketlen Vieira
Khalil Rountree 
Kyle Bochniak
Lando Vannata
Leonardo Guimarães
Lina Länsberg
Luan Chagas
Luke Sanders
Marc Diakiese
Mark Godbeer
Marcin Tybura
Martín Bravo
Martin Svensson
Marvin Vettori
Matt Schnell
Matthew Lopez
Max Griffin
Mehdi Baghdad
Mickey Gall
Michael McBride
Mike Jackson
Mike Perry
Niko Price
Paul Craig
Randy Brown
Rick Glenn
Ryan Janes
Sabah Homasi
Saparbek Safarov
Shane Burgos
Tatiana Suarez 
Thibault Gouti
Tyson Pedro
Veronica Macedo
Viviane Pereira
Will Brooks
Zak Ottow

Events list

See also
 List of UFC champions
 List of UFC events

References

External links
 UFC past events on UFC.com
 UFC events results at Sherdog.com

Ultimate Fighting Championship by year
2016 in mixed martial arts